The R614 is a Regional Route in South Africa.

Route
Its western terminus is the R33 just south of Albert Falls. It runs east, through Wartburg along the northern edge of the Valley of a Thousand Hills. The route ends at the R102 at Tongaat.

References

Regional Routes in KwaZulu-Natal